Edward Worlidge (born 3 December 1928) is a British former rower. He competed in the men's eight event at the 1952 Summer Olympics.

References

1928 births
Living people
British male rowers
Olympic rowers of Great Britain
Rowers at the 1952 Summer Olympics
Rowers from Greater London